XHFTI-FM is a radio station on 89.5 FM in Fortín de las Flores, Veracruz, Mexico. It is owned by Multimedios Radio and carries its La Lupe variety hits format.

History
XHFTI received its concession on January 31, 1994. It was owned by Susana Rodríguez Díaz and was part of the Grupo FM Multimedios family. It was sold to Frecuencia Modulada de Fortín in 2000 and raised its power from 3 kW to 60.

Grupo FM split into two concerns owned by different parts of the same family, Grupo FM and Radio Networks; RN owned the latter station along with XHRN-FM and XHTD-FM and programmed all three stations with a tropical music format known as Más Latina. On August 17, 2017, XHFTI flipped to La Caliente, beginning an association with Multimedios Radio. Multimedios bought the station outright in a transaction approved by the Federal Telecommunications Institute in November 2018.

All three Multimedios stations in Veracruz flipped from La Caliente to La Lupe on November 6, 2020.

References

Radio stations in Veracruz
Radio stations established in 1994
Multimedios Radio
1994 establishments in Mexico
Spanish-language radio stations